Michael Charles Johnston (born March 30, 1979) is a former baseball player. In 2004, Johnston made the Pirates team out of spring training despite never previously pitching above the AA level. By doing so, Johnston became the second known person with  Tourette syndrome to play in Major League Baseball, after Jim Eisenreich.  In October 2006, Johnston underwent surgery to repair a torn labrum. That November, he signed a minor league contract with the San Diego Padres.  The Chicago White Sox signed him to a minor league contract for the 2009 season. In 2012, he pitched for the  Lancaster Barnstormers of the Atlantic League of Professional Baseball.

References

External links

 Johnston cut in spring training, 2006

1979 births
Living people
Pittsburgh Pirates players
Major League Baseball pitchers
Baseball players from Pennsylvania
Gulf Coast Pirates players
Erie SeaWolves players
Williamsport Crosscutters players
Hickory Crawdads players
Lynchburg Hillcats players
Altoona Curve players
Nashville Sounds players
Indianapolis Indians players
Birmingham Barons players
Charlotte Knights players
Lancaster Barnstormers players
People with Tourette syndrome
Baseball players with disabilities